Donnchad Grana Ó Cellaigh (died 1589) was an Irish Lord.

Background

Descendants

Kelly of Uí Maine
Kings of Uí Maine
Máine Mór, founder of the kingdom of Uí Maine, fl. 4th-century A.D.
Tadhg Mór Ua Cellaigh, (1014) King of Uí Maine and first Chief of the Name
Peter Kelly (GAA)
Richard Kelly (The Tuam Herald)
Mary Eva Kelly
Mian Kelly
Patrick Kelly (US Army officer)
Rita Kelly
Thomas J. Kelly (Irish nationalist)

References
Full of the Old Galway Spirit: The O'Kellys of Creeraun and Cooloo, Diarmuid Ó Cearbhaill, pp. 72–95, Journal of the Galway Archaeological and Historical Society, Volume 59, 2007.

People from County Galway
16th-century Irish people
1589 deaths
Year of birth unknown
Irish lords